Greenhill Divide is a wind gap located in the San Isabel National Forest in the U.S. state of Colorado. It is located by the intersection of Colorado State Highway 165 and Colorado State Highway 78.

References

Mountain passes of Colorado
Climbing areas of Colorado
Landforms of Custer County, Colorado